Stuart A. Halsan (born July 8, 1952) is a former member of the Washington House of Representatives and the Washington State Senate.

Biography
Halsan was born on July 8, 1952 in Seattle, Washington. His great-great-grandfather, Oliver A. Caswell, was a member of the Wisconsin State Assembly. Halsan is Lutheran and is a member of the Fraternal Order of Eagles and Moose International.

Career
Halsan was a member of the House of Representatives from 1983 to 1985 and of the Senate from 1985 to 1988. He represented Washington's 20th legislative district in both cases. In 1988, he was a candidate for superior court judge. Halsan is a Democrat.

References

See also
The Political Graveyard

Politicians from Seattle
Democratic Party members of the Washington House of Representatives
1952 births
Living people
American Lutherans
21st-century Lutherans
Democratic Party Washington (state) state senators